Bembecia fibigeri is a moth of the family Sesiidae. It is found in southern France and Spain.

The wingspan is about 23 mm.

The larvae feed on Onodis rotundifolia and Onodis fruticosa.

References

Moths described in 1994
Sesiidae
Moths of Europe